Dziubek is a Polish surname. Notable people with the surname include:

Andrzej Dziubek (born 1954), Polish musician and vocalist
Michał Dziubek (born 1999), Polish footballer

Polish-language surnames